Israel's political system is based on proportional representation and allows for a multi-party system with numerous parties represented in the 120-seat Knesset.

A typical Knesset includes many factions represented. This is because of the low election threshold required for a seat – 1 percent of the vote from 1949 to 1992, 1.5 percent from 1992 to 2003, 2 percent from 2003 to 2014, and 3.25 percent since 2015. In the 2015 elections, for instance, ten parties or alliances cleared the threshold, and five of them won at least ten seats. The low threshold, in combination with the nationwide party-list system, makes it all but impossible for a single party to win the 61 seats needed for a majority government. No party has ever won a majority of seats in an election, the most being 56, won by the Alignment grouping in the 1969 elections (the Alignment had briefly held a majority of seats before the elections following its formation in January 1969).

As a result, while only four parties (or their antecedents) have ever led governments, all Israeli governments, have been coalitions comprising two or more parties.

Current parties

Parties represented in the Knesset
The following parties are represented following the 2022 election:

Other parties
The following parties do not have Knesset seats at present:

Ahrayut
Ale Yarok
Am Shalem
Ani Veata (Me and You) — The Israeli People's Party 
Arab Democratic Party
Balad
Bible Bloc
Brit Olam
Da'am Workers Party, Organization for Democratic Action
Derekh Eretz
Dor
Eretz Hadasha
HaYisraelim
Ihud Bnei HaBrit (United Allies)
Israel Hofsheet (Israel Free)
Kadima (held seats from 2005 to 2015)
Koah HaKesef
Koah LeHashpi'a
Lazuz
Leader
Lehem
Lev LaOlim
Man's Rights in the Family Party
Magen Yisrael (Shield of Israel)
Mahane Yehuda — Royalist Party of Israel
Meimad (held seats between 1999 and 2009 as part of the One Israel alliance)
Meretz
New Horizon
New Right
Or
Piratim — The Pirate Party of Israel
Rappeh — a political party protesting COVID restrictions.
Shavim (Community) — Founded in 2018 as an LGBT party
Telem
The Jewish Home
The Greens
Tzeirim Boarim (Youths on Fire) — A big tent party founded in 2022 by Hadar Muchtar with the purpose of combating the rising cost of living.
Tzomet (held seats between 1987 and 1999; for the 1996 elections, it formed a joint "National Camp List" with Likud and Gesher)
U'Bizchutan — founded in 2015 as an ultra-Orthodox Jewish women's party 
Yachad
Yisrael Hazaka
Yisrael HaMithadeshet
Zehut

Former parties

Parties formerly represented in the Knesset

Parties that failed to win seats in the Knesset

Name changes
The following parties changed their names
Banai became Tehiya-Bnai, then Tehiya
Emunim became Tkuma
Equality in Israel-Panthers became the Unity Party
Flatto-Sharon became Development and Peace
Hitkhabrut became the Renewed Religious National Zionist Party, then Ahi
Israel in the Centre became the Centre Party
Meretz became Yachad, then Meretz-Yachad, then Meretz again
Movement for Change and Initiative became Shinui
Mizrachi-Hapoel HaMizrachi became the National Religious Front, then National Religious Party, then The Jewish Home
National Responsibility became Kadima
National Unity - National Progressive Alliance became Progressive National Alliance
Parliamentary Group of Bronfman and Tsinker became Makhar, then the Democratic Choice
Party for the Advancement of the Zionist Idea became the New Liberal Party
Rafi – National List became Ometz
Rakah became Maki
Secular Faction became Hetz
Social-Democratic Faction became the Independent Socialist Faction
Shinui - Centre Party became Shinui - the Secular Movement, then Shinui - Party for the Secular and the Middle Class, but is generally known as Shinui

Zionist youth movements

See also 
Politics of Israel
List of political parties by country
Liberalism in Israel
Labor Zionism
Revisionist Zionism

References

External links
Parties participating in the 2006 elections Knesset website 
All parliamentary groups Knesset website 

 
 
Israel
Political parties
Israel
Political parties